Nur Suhada binti Jebat (born 17 March 1992) better known by her stage name, Ayda Jebat, is a Malaysian singer and actress. She was a participant of the ninth season of Akademi Fantasia. She became known to many through the drama Rindu Awak 200% (2014). Her film credits include Gila-Gila Remaja 2 (2013) and Pinjamkan Hatiku (2017).

Early life 
Born Nur Suhada binti Jebat on 17 March 1992 in Ayer Keroh, Melaka Ayda is the eldest of four siblings, she has two sisters and a brother. One of her younger sisters, Nur Syafinaz "Fyna" Jebat, is a singer and businesswoman. She and her siblings were raised by their mother after their parents' divorce.

Career

2011–2013: Akadmei Fantasia and career beginnings 
Ayda's career began after joining the Akademi Fantasia reality show for its ninth season where at a curtain concert held on 2 April 2011, she sang the song Separuh Nafas group song Dewa 19 and Love The Way You Lie song Rihanna. Ayda was eliminated through Operation Fall, in the third week.  After Akademi Fantasia 9 ended, Ayda recorded her debut single, "Beri Aku Waktu".

Ayda made her acting debut in the telefilm CerCiter Cinta. In 2013, Ayda made her film debut in the sequel to Gila-Gila Remaja, Gila-Gila Remaja 2 as Zetty

2014: Success with Rindu Awak 200% 
Ayda had a breakout role in 2014 when she played the character of Armel Aisya in the drama adaptation of the novel Rindu Awak 200% opposite Zul Ariffin. The success of the series led her to winning the MeleTOP New Artist Award at Anugerah MeleTOP Era.

2015 – present: Career development 

In 2015, following the success of the drama Rindu Awak 200%, Ayda got her second lead role in the TV series, Suami Sebelah Rumah opposite, Izzue Islam. She was also cast in the series Isteri Separuh Masa alongside Emma Maembong and Aiman Hakim Ridza. She was once again paired with Zul Ariffin for the drama series adaptation of the novel, M.A.I.D..

She dubbed the Malay language version of the 2014 American science fiction action film, Transformers: Age of Extinction, as Tessa Yeager played by Nicola Peltz.

In July 2015, she released a single "Siapa Diriku" produced by Omar K. The song is about the reality of the life of an artist who is often the victim of criticism netizens on social media. The accompanying music video, which was uploaded on his official YouTube channel on 14 September 2015, managed to reach over one million views in three weeks.

Ayda is well-known across the Malay world. Ayda starred in the Indonesian, RTV telefilm, From Hater to Lover with Dimas Aditya.

Personal life 
She was engaged to host and actor Nabil Mahir on April 28, 2020, in conjunction with Nabil's 32nd birthday. The couple got engaged online using the Google Meet app.

Ayda and Nabil solemnised their marriage on 1 January 2021. On 21 September 2021, Ayda gave birth to a daughter, Ana Nayla.

Discography

Singles

Filmography

Film

Drama

Telefilm

Web series

Television

Videography

References

External links 

 
 
 
 
 
 

1992 births
Living people
Akademi Fantasia participants
Articles with hCards
Malay-language singers
Malaysian film actresses
Malaysian Muslims
Malaysian people of Malay descent
Malaysian television actresses
Malaysian women singers
Malaysian voice actresses
People from Malacca
21st-century Malaysian actresses